The ICD-10 Clinical Modification (ICD-10-CM) is a modification of the ICD-10, authorized by the World Health Organization, used as a source for diagnosis codes in the United States of America. It replaces the earlier ICD-9-CM.

Adoption 
Adoption of ICD-10-CM was slow in the United States.  Since 1979, the US had required ICD-9-CM codes for Medicare and Medicaid claims, and most of the rest of the American medical industry followed suit.  On 1 January 1999 the ICD-10 (without clinical extensions) was adopted for reporting mortality, but ICD-9-CM was still used for morbidity.  Meanwhile, the U.S. National Center for Health Statistics (NCHS) received permission from the WHO to create a clinical modification of the ICD-10, and has production of all these systems:

 ICD-10-CM, for diagnosis codes, replaces volumes 1 and 2. Annual updates are provided.
 ICD-10-PCS, for procedure codes, replaces volume 3. Annual updates are provided.

On 21 August 2008, the US Department of Health and Human Services (HHS) proposed new code sets to be used for reporting diagnoses and procedures on health care transactions. Under the proposal, the ICD-9-CM code sets would be replaced with the ICD-10-CM code sets, effective 1 October 2013. On 17 April 2012 the Department of Health and Human Services (HHS) published a proposed rule that would delay, from 1 October 2013 to 1 October 2014, the compliance date for the ICD-10-CM and PCS. Once again, Congress delayed the implementation date to 1 October 2015, after it was inserted into the "Doc Fix" Bill without debate over the objections of many.

Revisions 
Compared to the base ICD-10 classification; revisions to ICD-10-CM include:
 Relevant information for ambulatory and managed care encounters.
 Expanded injury codes.
 New combination codes for diagnosis/symptoms to reduce the number of codes needed to describe a problem fully.
 Addition of sixth and seventh digit classification.
 Classification specific to laterality.
 Classification refinement for increased data granularity.

The ICD-10-CM code set is reviewed every year. The code set for the 2023 fiscal year applies to patient discharges and encounters between October 1, 2022, and September 30, 2023 (inclusive) – with the exception of four codes that were in effect from April 1, 2022.

References

See also 
 ICD-11

International Classification of Diseases